The regions of Djibouti are the primary geographical divisions through which Djibouti is administered.

History

The first administrative division of the territory, in 1914, defined two zones besides the city of Djibouti: the districts "Dankali" and "Issa". With the occupation of the territory at the end of the 1920s, the circles of Tadjoura and "Gobad-Dikkil" are created. In 1939, the circle of Ali Sabieh is extracted from the last. In 1963, Obock's circle was created by division of that of Tadjourah region.

In 1967, the circle of Djibouti is transformed into district, then divided into three districts.

After independence in 1977, the circles become regions. The last important modification of the administrative map of the territory is the creation of the region of Arta in 2003.

Regions

See also
 ISO 3166-2:DJ

 
Subdivisions of Djibouti